Rabri (IAST: Rabaḍī), (Bengali: রাবরি) is a sweet, condensed-milk-based dish, originating from the Indian subcontinent, more specifically Bengal region. Rabri is made by boiling milk on low heat for a long time until it becomes dense and changes its colour to off-white or pale yellow. Jaggery, spices, and nuts are added to it to give it flavor. It is chilled and served as dessert. Rabri is the main ingredient in several desserts, such as rasabali, chhena kheeri, and khira sagara. 

A similar dish goes by the name basundi.

History 
Chandimangala mentions rabdi (thickened, sweetened milk), along with other sweets, in the early 1400s.

Rabri was banned in Kolkata 1965 during an economic recession for its excessive use of milk. It was overturned within the year by the Calcutta High Court due to lawsuits from independent sweet shops.

Creation
Rabri is made by heating sweetened milk in a large open vessel (kadhai). As the layer of cream begins to form on the surface of the milk, it is taken off and kept aside. The process continues until the milk is exhausted.

See also
 Basundi, a similar dish

References

Indian desserts
Rajasthani cuisine
North Indian cuisine
Pakistani cuisine
Puddings
Indian dairy products